Lipocosma furvalis is a moth in the family Crambidae. It was described by George Hampson in 1912. It is found from Mexico south to Costa Rica and the Lesser Antilles.

References

Glaphyriinae
Moths described in 1912